Richard Dadd (1 August 1817 – 7 January 1886) was an English painter of the Victorian era, noted for his depictions of fairies and other supernatural subjects, Orientalist scenes, and enigmatic genre scenes, rendered with obsessively minuscule detail. Most of the works for which he is best known were created while he was a patient in Bethlem and Broadmoor hospitals.

Early life
Richard Dadd was born at Chatham, Kent, England, on 1 August 1817, the son of chemist Robert Dadd (1788/9–1843) and Mary Ann (1790–1824), daughter of shipwright Richard Martin. He was educated at King's School, Rochester where his aptitude for drawing was evident at an early age, leading to his admission to the Royal Academy of Arts at the age of 20. He was awarded the medal for life drawing in 1840. With William Powell Frith, Augustus Egg, Henry O'Neil and others, he founded The Clique, of which he was generally considered the leading talent. He was also trained at William Dadson's Academy of Art.

Career

Among his best-known early works are the illustrations he produced for The Book of British Ballads (1842), and a frontispiece he designed for The Kentish Coronal (1840).

In July 1842, Sir Thomas Phillips, the former mayor of Newport, chose Dadd to accompany him as his draughtsman on an expedition through Europe to Greece, Turkey, Southern Syria and finally Egypt. In November of that year they spent a gruelling two weeks in Southern Syria, passing from Jerusalem to Jordan and returning across the Engaddi wilderness. Toward the end of December, while travelling up the Nile by boat, Dadd underwent a dramatic personality change, becoming delusional, increasingly violent, and believing himself to be under the influence of the Egyptian god Osiris. His condition was initially thought to be sunstroke.

Mental illness and hospitalization

On his return in the spring of 1843, he was diagnosed to be of unsound mind and was taken by his family to recuperate in the rural village of Cobham, Kent. In August of that year, having become convinced that his father was the Devil in disguise, Dadd killed him with a knife and fled to France. En route to Paris, Dadd attempted to kill a fellow passenger with a razor but was overpowered and arrested by police. Dadd confessed to killing his father and was returned to England, where he was committed to the criminal department of Bethlem psychiatric hospital (also known as Bedlam). Here and subsequently at the newly created Broadmoor Hospital, Dadd was cared for in an enlightened manner by Doctors William Wood, William Orange and Sir W. Charles Hood.

Dadd probably had paranoid schizophrenia. Two of his siblings had the condition, while a third had "a private attendant" for unknown reasons.

In hospital, Dadd was encouraged to continue painting, and in 1852 he created a remarkable portrait of one of his doctors, Alexander Morison, which now hangs in the Scottish National Portrait Gallery. Dadd painted many of his masterpieces in Bethlem and Broadmoor, including The Fairy Feller's Master-Stroke, which he worked on between 1855 and 1864. Dadd was pictured at work on his Contradiction: Oberon and Titania by the London society photographer Henry Hering. Also dating from the 1850s are the 33 watercolour drawings titled Sketches to Illustrate the Passions, which include Grief or Sorrow, Love, and Jealousy, as well as Agony-Raving Madness and Murder. Like most of his works, these are executed on a small scale and feature protagonists whose eyes are fixed in a peculiar, unfocused stare. Dadd also produced many shipping scenes and landscapes during his hospitalization, such as the ethereal 1861 watercolour Port Stragglin. These are executed with a miniaturist's eye for detail which belie the fact that they are products of imagination and memory.

Death
After 20 years at Bethlem, Dadd was moved to Broadmoor Hospital, a high security facility outside London. There he remained, painting constantly and receiving infrequent visitors until 7 January 1886, when he died "from an extensive disease of the lungs". A number of his works remain on display at Broadmoor.

Legacy

Freddie Mercury was inspired to write the song 'The Fairy Feller's Master-Stroke' based on Dadd's painting, which he had seen at the Tate Gallery. In 2013 Neil Gaiman wrote an essay about the painting for Intelligent Life (now called 1843 magazine).

Angela Carter wrote Come unto these Yellow Sands, a radio-play based on Dadd's life, first broadcast in 1979.

Canadian author R.J. Anderson acknowledges Dadd as the basis of her fictional painter Alfred Wrenfield, who figures prominently in her young adult fantasy novel Knife (2009).

In 1987 a long-lost watercolour by Dadd, The Artist's Halt in the Desert, was discovered by Peter Nahum on the BBC TV programme Antiques Roadshow. Made while the artist was incarcerated, it is based on sketches made during his tour of the Middle East, and shows his party encamped by the Dead Sea, with Dadd at the far right. It was later sold for £100,000 to the British Museum.

Loreena McKennitt features Dadd's 1862 painting "Bacchanalian Scene" on the cover of her 1987 Christmas CD To Drive the Cold Winter Away

Terry Pratchett included The Fairy Feller's Master-Stroke in his 2003 Discworld novel The Wee Free Men. Tiffany, the protagonist, finds it in a book of fairy-tales and later escapes from a dream set within the picture. In the author's note, Pratchett describes the painting and gives a brief but sympathetic summary of Dadd's personal history and struggle with mental illness.

Elizabeth McGregor wrote The Green Girl In The Green Glass Mirror, a 2005 novel which features the work of Dadd, including a fictional painting of an unknown Dadd.

 Gallery 

See also
 Fairy painting
 List of Orientalist artists

Notes

References
 Allderidge, Patricia (1974). Richard Dadd. New York and London: St. Martin's Press/Academy Editions.
 Allderidge, Patricia (1974). The Late Richard Dadd 1817–1886. London: The Tate Gallery.
 Chaney, Edward (2006). 'Egypt in England and America: The Cultural Memorials of Religion, Royalty and Religion', Sites of Exchange: European Crossroads and Faultlines, eds. M. Ascari and A. Corrado. Amsterdam and New York: Rodopi.
 Chaney, Edward (2006b). 'Freudian Egypt', The London Magazine (April/May 2006), pp. 62–69.
 Greysmith, David (1973). Richard Dadd: The Rock and Castle of Seclusion. New York: Macmillan Publishing Co., Inc.

 Tromans, Nicholas (2011). Richard Dadd: the Artist and the Asylum. London: The Tate Gallery.
 

External links

 "Mercy - David Spareth Saul’s Life by Richard Dadd" at Bible.Gallery
 Biography at Tate online by Patricia H. Allderidge
 "Richard Dadd: The art of a 'criminal lunatic' murderer", BBC News Magazine Dadd's portrait of Alexander Morison
 Richard Dadd at The Berkshire Record Biography at PopSubculture.com
 The Book of British Ballads (1842), illustrated by DaddThe Kentish Coronal'' (1840), frontispiece by Dadd

1817 births
1886 deaths
19th-century English painters
English male painters
Fantasy artists
Deaths from lung disease
Deaths in mental institutions
English murderers
Orientalist painters
History of mental health in the United Kingdom
People acquitted by reason of insanity
Patricides
People from Chatham, Kent
English illustrators
People detained at Broadmoor Hospital
19th-century English male artists
1843 murders in the United Kingdom